Andrea Gnassi (born 27 March 1969, in Rimini) is an Italian politician.

In 2011, Gnassi ran for the Mayor of Rimini as the candidate of Democratic Party. He won in the second round, defeating the centre-right candidate Gioenzo Renzi with 53.47% of the vote.

In 2016, he won a second mandate as Mayor of Rimini, after obtaining 37.39% of the vote in the first round and 56.99% of the vote in a runoff against centre-right candidate Marzio Pecci.

References

External links
 
 

1969 births
Living people
People from Rimini
21st-century Italian politicians
University of Bologna alumni
Mayors of Rimini
Presidents of the Province of Rimini